The Army Staff Senior Warrant Officer (ARSTAF SWO) provides the Chief of Staff of the United States Army (CSA) with subject matter expertise on warrant officer training and development, to include proper balance of training, education and professional experience for warrant officers. Additionally, the ARSTAF SWO communicates with commanders and warrant officers throughout the United States Army to ensure their concerns and recommendations are considered in decisions that will impact the future of the warrant officer corps.

The post was announced by CSA, GEN Raymond T. Odierno on March 14, 2014, wherein CW5 David Williams was established as the first ARSTAF SWO. The ARSTAF SWO is the first, and currently, only posting for warrant officers to the head of all six branches of the United States armed forces.

List of Army Staff Senior Warrant Officers

See also
 Sergeant Major of the Army
 Chief of Staff of the United States Army

References

Military ranks of the United States Army
Warrant officers